Grycksbo IF is a sports club in Grycksbo, Sweden, established in 1908. The club runs bandy, orienteering, skiing and soccer. The men's bandy team played in the Swedish top division in the season of 1963–1964.

Three-time Vasaloppet winner Daniel Tynell first competed for Grycksbo IF.

References

External links
 Official website (bandy) 
 Official website (roeinteering) 
 Official website (skiing) 
 Official website (soccer) 

1908 establishments in Sweden
Bandy clubs in Sweden
Football clubs in Dalarna County
Orienteering clubs in Sweden
Ski clubs in Sweden
Sport in Dalarna County
Sports clubs established in 1908
Association football clubs established in 1908
Bandy clubs established in 1908